Michigan Proposal 20-2 was a ballot initiative approved by voters in Michigan as part of the 2020 United States elections.

Contents
The proposal appeared on the ballot as follows:

Results

The proposal was approved in a landslide, with around 88% of the vote.

See also
 List of Michigan ballot proposals

References

Michigan Proposal 2
Michigan ballot proposals
Proposal 2